Hammer and Bolter is an animated series based on the Warhammer 40,000 games. 13 episodes were broadcast from September to December 2022.

Plot
Hammer and Bolter is an anthology series, with the first 8 episodes directed by Dylan Shipley. Each 30 minute episode focuses on one particular faction from the Games Workshop universe, such as the Imperial Guard, Chaos Space Marines, Orcs, Necrons, or Tyranid Genestealers. The animation style is reminiscent of 1980s Japanese anime.

Episodes

Reviews
Critics have generally responded favorably to the series due to the quality of the animation, the dialog, and its faithfulness to the source material. The episode Old Bale Eye received particularly high praise due to the presence of the fan-favorite character Commisar Yarrick.

References

Space marines
2022 animated television series debuts
science fiction horror
Warhammer 40,000